Members of the New South Wales Legislative Assembly who served in the 44th parliament held their seats from 1973 to 1976. They were elected at the 1973 state election, and at by-elections. The Speaker was Jim Cameron.

See also
Sixth Askin ministry
First Lewis ministry
Second Lewis ministry
Willis ministry
Results of the 1973 New South Wales state election (Legislative Assembly)
Candidates of the 1973 New South Wales state election

References

Members of New South Wales parliaments by term
20th-century Australian politicians